Maline is a small settlement just east of Trebelno in the Municipality of Mokronog-Trebelno in southeastern Slovenia. The area is part of the historical region of Lower Carniola. The municipality is now included in the Southeast Slovenia Statistical Region.

References

External links

Maline on Geopedia

Populated places in the Municipality of Mokronog-Trebelno